Moustafa "Tapha" Diarra (born 27 December 1970) is a Senegalese sprinter. He competed in the men's 4 × 400 metres relay at the 1996 Summer Olympics.

References

External links
 

1970 births
Living people
Athletes (track and field) at the 1996 Summer Olympics
Senegalese male sprinters
Olympic athletes of Senegal
Place of birth missing (living people)